Conleth Seamus Eoin Croiston Hill (born 24 November 1964) is an actor from Northern Ireland. He has performed on stage in productions in the UK, Ireland, Canada and the United States. He has won two Laurence Olivier Awards and received two Tony Award nominations. He is best known for his role as Varys in the HBO series Game of Thrones (2011–2019).

Early life
Conleth Hill was born in Ballycastle in County Antrim, Northern Ireland. He has an older brother who works as a cameraman, a sister who is a producer, and a younger brother, Ronan, who is a sound engineer who has won four Emmy Awards for his sound mixing on Game of Thrones.

Hill attended St MacNissi's College, Garron Tower and graduated from the Guildhall School of Music and Drama's (Clothworkers Company Scholar) acting programme in 1989.

Career
Hill made his Broadway debut in Marie Jones' Stones in His Pockets. For his work in the Canadian production of the play he received a Dora Mavor Moore Award. He played the German professor Max Staefel in a television adaptation of Goodbye, Mr Chips (2002).  He played "Mum" to Peter Kay's character, Geraldine McQueen, in Peter Kay's Britain's Got the Pop Factor... and Possibly a New Celebrity Jesus Christ Soapstar Superstar Strictly on Ice, a spoof on the talent show genre of programmes. He also played the role of Edward Darby in the television series Suits, alongside his Game of Thrones co-star, Michelle Fairley. 

From 2011 to 2019, Hill appeared as Varys in the television series Game of Thrones, based on George R. R. Martin's novel series A Song of Ice and Fire. Martin hinted, in a February 2013 post on his website, that he thought Hill would be a good choice to play the title character in a TV show based on Martin's science fiction novel Tuf Voyaging. He appeared in Series 2 episode 2 of Peter Kay's Car Share as Elsie, the drunk deli counter supervisor dressed as Smurfette. He also appeared as Carlos Santini in Season 3, Episode 4 of Derry Girls.

Filmography

Films

Television

Video games

Audio books

Radio
{| class="wikitable sortable"
|-
! Date !! Title !! Role !! Author !! Director !! Station

|- id="The Man Who Came to Dinner"
| 
| The Man Who Came to Dinner
|
| Moss Hart and George S Kaufmanadapted for radio by Marcy Kahan
| Ned Chaillet
| BBC Radio 4
|- id="Tricycles"
| 
| Tricycles
|
| Colin Teevan
| Toby Swift
| BBC Radio 3 The Wire
|- id="The Travels of Marco Polo"
| 
| The Travels of Marco Polo
|
| Philip Palmer
| Toby Swift
| BBC Radio 4 Afternoon Play
|- id="Titanic Letters"
| 
| Ciaran Hinds#Titanic letters|Titanic letters| Reader, ep.33
| 
| Ciaran Hinds
| BBC Radio Ulster 
|- id="The Biggest Issues"
| 
| Eoin O'Callaghan#The Biggest Issues|The Biggest Issues
| Jerry Cartwright
| Annie McCartney
| Eoin O'Callaghan
| BBC Radio 4 Afternoon Drama
|- 
| 2017
|Big Country
| JD Quinn
| Patrick Kielty
| 
| BBC Radio Ulster
|}

Theatre

Stage productions

 Winners by Brian Friel, as Joe; One day in summer in a garden as Uncle Jim, Incredible adventure of doctor Faustus as Mephistopheles secretary, Fools' bar Various Roles, Fringe Benefits Theatre Company (1984–85)
 The Adventures of a Bear Called Paddington, Various Roles, the Arts Theatre, Ardhowen Theatre, Belfast; Riverside Theatre, Coleraine (1986)
 West Side Story, as Bernardo - Leader of the Sharks, Ulster Youth Theatre (1986)
 Broken Nails by Damian Gorman, as Joe, St Peter's Cathedral in West Belfast (1988)
 Orlando, Guildhall School of Music and Drama (1988)
 Girl Crazy, Guildhall School of Music & Drama (1989)
 Little Shop of Horrors, Lyric Theatre (Belfast) (1989)
 The School for Wives as Horace, The John Player Theatre, The Arts Theatre (Belfast) (1989)
 The Picture of Dorian Gray, as Dorian, Arts Theatre (Belfast) (1989)
 Too Late To Talk To Billy as John Fletcher, Arts Theatre, 1990
 Oliver Twist as Artful Dodger / Mr.Limbkins etc. Lyric Theatre (1990)
 Over the bridge by Sam Thompson as Ephraim Smart, Lyric Theatre (1990)
 Playboy of the Western World as Shawn Keogh, Lyric Theatre (1990)
 The Iceman Cometh as Willie Oban, Lyric Theatre (Belfast) (1990)
 The Importance of Being Earnest as Algernon, Lyric Theatre (Belfast) (1990)
 Leave him to heaven, The Arts Theatre (Belfast) (1991)
 Government inspector Playwright Marie Jones Adapted Nikolai Gogol, as Headmaster, The Rock Theatre (1993) 
 Christmas Eve Can Kill You, Lyric Theatre (Belfast) (1994)
 Playboy of the Western World as Christy Mahon, Redgrave Theatre, Farnham (1994) 
 Tall Tales for Small People (Tall Tales For Cold, Dark Nights), Communicado (Scotland) (1995) 
 Eddie Bottom's dream by Marie Jones, as Puck, Lyric Theatre (Belfast) 
 Stones in His Pockets as Charlie, Lyric Theatre (Belfast); Gaiety Theatre (Dublin); Traverse Theatre (Edinburgh); Tricycle, New Ambassadors, Duke of York's (London); Winter Garden Theatre (Toronto); Golden Theater, (New York) (1996 with Tim Murphy) (1999 with Sean Campion)
 No Stars On Sunday by Tim Loane, Old museum Arts Center (Belfast) (1998)
 A Midsummer Night's Dream as Nick Bottom, Lyric Theatre (Belfast) (1997)
 Playboy of the Western World as Christy Mahon, Lyric Theatre (Belfast) (1997)
 Shining Souls, Old Vic (London) (1997)
 The Suicide by Nikolai Erdman, as Semyon Podsekalnikov, Communicado (Scotland) (1997) 
 Juno and the Paycock as Joxer Daly, Royal Lyceum (Edinburgh) (1998) 
 Northern Star by Stewart Parker, as Henry Joy McCraken, Field Day/Tinderbox (1998)
 Christmas Carol, Communicado (Scotland) (1998) 
 A Whistle in the Dark as Michael Carney, Lyric Theatre (Belfast) (1999) 
 Criminal Genius as motel manager Phillie, Prime Cut Productions (Belfast) (1999)
 Waiting for Godot as Estragon, Lyric Theatre (Belfast) (1999)
 Conversations on a Homecoming as Michael, Lyric Theatre (Belfast) (2002)
 After Darwin as Charles Darwin, Prime Cut Productions (Dublin and Belfast) (2002)
 The Chance as Daniel, Prime Cut Productions (Belfast) (2002) 
 Democracy as Gunter Guillaume, National Theatre (London) (2003)
 The Producers as Roger DeBris, Theatre Royal, Drury Lane (London) (2004)
 Shoot the Crow as Petesy, Trafalgar Studios (London); Royal Exchange Theatre (Manchester) (2005)
 Endgame as Hamm, Prime Cut Productions (Belfast) (2006) 
 Philistines as Teterev, National Theatre (London) (2007) 
 The Seafarer, as Ivan Curry, National Theatre (London); Booth Theatre (New York) (2007) 
 Dallas Sweetman as Dallas Sweetman, Canterbury Cathedral (2008)
 All's Well that Ends Well as Parolles, National Theatre (London) (2009)
 Home Place as Richard, Lyric Theatre (Belfast) (2009)
 STARS – A Ballycastle Nativity by Damian Gorman, Cross & Passion College and Ballycastle High School (Ballycastle) (2009)
 White Guard as Leonid Shervinskiy, National Theatre (London) (2010) 
 The Cherry Orchard, as Lopakhin, National Theatre, London (2011)
 Uncle Vanya as Uncle Vanya, Lyric Theatre (Belfast) (2011)
 Quartermaine's Terms, as Henry, Wyndham's Theatre, London (2013)
 Macbeth, as Macbeth, Berkeley Repertory Theatre, Berkeley (2016)
 Who's Afraid of Virginia Woolf?, as George, Harold Pinter Theatre, London (2017)
 SPUD, Lyric Theatre (Belfast) Director (2019)
 The Antipodes, as Sandy, National Theatre, London (2019)

Awards and nominations
 2000 Irish Times award, for Stones in His Pockets
 2001 Olivier Awards, Best Actor, for Stones in His Pockets
 2001 Tony Award nomination, Best Actor in a Play, for Stones in His Pockets
 2001 Drama Desk Award, Special Award, for Stones in His Pockets
 2001 Outer Critics Circle Award, for Stones in His Pockets
 2001 Whatsonstage award, Best Actor for Stones in His Pockets
 2001 Dora Awards, for Stones in His Pockets
 2005 The Critics Circle Theatre Awards, winner of Best Musical for "The Producers"
 2005 Olivier Awards, Best Performance in a Supporting Role in a Musical, for The Producers
 2008 Tony Award nomination, Best Featured Actor in a Play, for The Seafarer
 2008 Drama Desk Award for Outstanding Featured Actor in a Play, for The Seafarer
 2011–2016 nominated for Screen Actors Guild Award for Outstanding Performance by an Ensemble in a Drama Series for Game of Thrones

References

External links
 
 

1964 births
20th-century male actors from Northern Ireland
21st-century male actors from Northern Ireland
Dora Mavor Moore Award winners
Drama Desk Award winners
Male film actors from Northern Ireland
Laurence Olivier Award winners
Living people
People from Ballycastle, County Antrim
Male stage actors from Northern Ireland
Male television actors from Northern Ireland
Male Shakespearean actors from Northern Ireland